The Bulnes Funicular is an underground funicular connecting the villages of Bulnes and Poncebos in the Picos de Europa region of the Cantabrian Mountains in Asturias, Spain.

Overview
Traditionally, the only routes to the village were the strenuous two-hour trail from Poncebos and the mountain path from Sotres. There are no vehicular routes to the village. To provide better access to Bulnes and to open up the region to tourism, the Asturias government developed the Bulnes Funicular which opened in September 2001. In the first 10 years after opening, the funicular recorded 500,000 passengers.

The funicular is a single-track railway with an 18% slope that operates through a tunnel below the mountains north of Bulnes. There are no other stations along the route.

There are two passenger cars for the funicular, with total capacity of 48 passengers, in addition to a freight car that is used to transport goods to Bulnes.  The funicular operates 365 days a year and departs at 30 minute intervals.  Fares are collected to use the funicular, except for residents of Bulnes who can travel for free.

Gallery

References

Funicular railways in Spain
Railway lines opened in 2001